In model theory, a discipline within mathematical logic, an abstract elementary class, or AEC for short, is a class of models  with a partial order similar to  the relation of an elementary substructure of an elementary class in first-order model theory. They were introduced by Saharon Shelah.

Definition 
, for  a class of structures in some language , is an AEC if it has the following properties:
 Isomorphisms:  is closed under isomorphisms, and  if     and  then 
 Coherence: If   and  then 
  
 If , for all , then 

Note that we usually do not care about the models of size less than the Löwenheim–Skolem number and often assume that there are none (we will adopt this convention in this article). This is justified since we can always remove all such models from an AEC without influencing its structure above the Löwenheim–Skolem number.

If  is clear from context, we omit it.

Examples 

The following are examples of abstract elementary classes:

 An Elementary class is the most basic example of an AEC: If T is a first-order theory, then the class  of models of T together with elementary substructure forms an AEC with Löwenheim–Skolem number |T|.
 If T is a first-order countable superstable theory, the set of -saturated models of T, together with elementary substructure, is an AEC with Löwenheim–Skolem number .
 Zilber's pseudo-exponential fields form an AEC.

Common assumptions 

AECs are very general objects and one usually make some of the assumptions below when studying them:

 An AEC has joint embedding if any two model can be embedded inside a common model. 
 An AEC has no maximal model if any model has a proper extension.

Note that in elementary classes, joint embedding holds whenever the theory is complete, while amalgamation and no maximal models are well-known consequences of the compactness theorem. These three assumptions allow us to build a universal model-homogeneous monster model , exactly as in the elementary case.

Another assumption that one can make is tameness.

Shelah's categoricity conjecture 

Shelah introduced AECs to provide a uniform framework in which to generalize first-order classification theory. Classification theory started with Morley's categoricity theorem, so it is natural to ask whether a similar result holds in AECs. This is Shelah's eventual categoricity conjecture. It states that there should be a Hanf number for categoricity:

Shelah also has several stronger conjectures: The threshold cardinal for categoricity is the Hanf number of pseudoelementary classes in a language of cardinality LS(K). This conjecture dates back to 1976.

Several approximations have been published (see for example the results section below), assuming set-theoretic assumptions (such as the existence of large cardinals or variations of the generalized continuum hypothesis), or model-theoretic assumptions (such as amalgamation or tameness). As of 2014, the original conjecture remains open.

Results 
The following are some important results about AECs. Except for the last, all results are due to Shelah.

 Shelah's Presentation Theorem: Any AEC  is : it is a reduct of a class of models of a first-order theory omitting at most  types.
 Hanf number for existence: Any AEC  which has a model of size  has models of arbitrarily large sizes.
In particular, no sentence of  can have exactly one uncountable model.
 Approximations to Shelah's categoricity conjecture: 
Downward transfer from a successor: If K is an abstract elementary class with amalgamation that is categorical in a "high-enough" successor , then K is categorical in all high-enough .
 Shelah's categoricity conjecture for a successor from large cardinals: If there are class-many strongly compact cardinals, then Shelah's categoricity conjecture holds when we start with categoricity at a successor.

See also

 Tame abstract elementary class

Notes

References

 

 

Model theory
Category theory